Kurbanlı is a village in the Tarsus district of Mersin Province, Turkey. At  in it is situated in the southern slopes of the Toros Mountains and to the west of Turkish state highway . The population of Kurbanlı was 192  as of 2012.

References

Villages in Tarsus District